Richard John Grieco Jr. (born March 23, 1965) is an American actor and former fashion model. He played Detective Dennis Booker in the popular Fox series 21 Jump Street (1988–89) and its spin-off Booker (1989–90). He has also starred in various films, including If Looks Could Kill and Mobsters (both 1991). He has voiced characters in several video games and appeared as either himself or his 21 Jump Street character in several films and television shows. Since 2009, he worked as a painter, working in a style he calls abstract emotionalism.

Early life
Richard Grieco was born in Watertown, New York, the son of Richard and Carolyn (née O'Reilly) Grieco. He is of Italian and Irish descent.<ref>"Richard Grieco; '21 Jumpstreet' adds a Handsome Rebel", "The Washington Post, 7 May 1989 </ref> 

Career

Modeling, TV and film
Grieco worked as a model for Armani, Calvin Klein and Chanel. He played Rick Gardner on One Life to Live from 1985 to 1987. In 1988, Grieco began appearing as Detective Dennis Booker on the shows 21 Jump Street and its spinoff Booker. Grieco's feature film debut was as Michael Corben in If Looks Could Kill (1991) and has appeared in numerous films since then. Later in 1991, he played the young Jewish bootlegger and mobster Benjamin "Bugsy" Siegel in the film Mobsters. He also appeared in the TV series Marker in 1995. He played himself in the 1998 film A Night at the Roxbury as well as in an episode of the FX comedy It's Always Sunny in Philadelphia .

Music
Grieco began a singing career in 1994 with the Dunmire Band. He signed to a German label and released a CD, Waiting for the Sky to Fall, in 1995; he re-released the album in 2011, making it available on streaming services such as iTunes and Spotify. In 2004, he formed the band Wasteland Park with music manager Cheryl Bogart.

Art
In 2009, several years after being encouraged to do so by Dennis Hopper, Grieco publicly revealed that he has been painting since 1991 and sold his first painting for $10,900.  He calls his work "Abstract Emotionalism."

In popular culture
In the WB sitcom Off Centre, Grieco is idolized by Chau Presley, a character played by John Cho. In the show, Chau meets Grieco at the Department of Motor Vehicles and trades him an Oingo Boingo shirt for the one he is wearing. Several references are made to Grieco and his films (especially Point Doom).

In A Night at the Roxbury, Grieco is idolized by the main characters. His lifestyle ("Clothes, Cars, Women") was what Doug and Steve Butabi were trying to achieve.

In 2016, he appeared as himself in an episode of It's Always Sunny in Philadelphia''.

Filmography

Film

Television

Video games

Web

References

External links
 
 Richard Grieco Fine Art website
 

1965 births
21st-century American male actors
Male models from New York (state)
American male soap opera actors
American male television actors
American male voice actors
American male film actors
American male video game actors
American people of Irish descent
American people of Italian descent
Central Connecticut Blue Devils football players
Living people
Participants in American reality television series
People from Watertown, New York
20th-century American male actors
20th-century American singers
21st-century American singers
20th-century American male singers
21st-century American male singers